The 4th Biathlon European Championships were held in Windischgarsten, Austria. Six competitions were held for athletes U26: sprint, individual and relays.

Results

U26

Men's

Women's

Medal table

References

External links 
 IBU full results

Biathlon European Championships
International sports competitions hosted by Austria
1997 in biathlon
1997 in Austrian sport
Biathlon competitions in Austria